Zeytinliova is a municipality in Akhisar District, Manisa Province, Turkey. It is also known as Palamut, Yavaköy and Yayaköy.  It is 18 km from the town of Akhisar.The population of Zeytinliova was 3769  as of 2011.

The municipality has a Mediterranean climate with summers that are hot and dry, and winters that are mild and rainy. The municipality varies considerably in elevation from 235 m. to 300 m. The economy is primarily agricultural and the main commercial crop is olives, notably the domat. In Fevzi Pasha there is a park in the national forest.

Notes

Populated places in Manisa Province